Martin Bruns (born 1960) is a Swiss baritone and music lecturer.

Life and career
Buns was born in Basel. During his school years, Martin Bruns was a member of the Knabenkantorei Basel and was influenced by this musical environment. He first studied violin at the City of Basel Music Academy and then became a member of the Bern Symphony Orchestra. After a few years he decided to study singing in addition and attended the Fribourg and Zurich universities and Daniel Ferro's singing class at the Juilliard School in New York City. In addition, he took masterclass with renowned artists such as Irwin Gage, Ernst Haefliger, Arleen Augér and Phyllis Curtin. 

After his studies, Bruns began his singing career as a member of the ensemble at the Hessian State Theatre in Wiesbaden. In addition, he has accepted numerous invitations to guest appearances at renowned German and European theatres and has performed with many major orchestras in Europe and North America. Brun's repertoire includes vocal parts from early baroque music to Mozart and Mahler up to contemporary music.

A main focus of his vocal performances is the song repertoire, especially the lesser known works of the 20th century such as those by Ferruccio Busoni, Ignace Strasfogel or David Diamond. Brun's regular piano accompanists include Kolja Lessing, Brian Zeger, Jan Philipp Schulze, Ulrich Eisenlohr and Christoph Hammer. Through numerous premieres and first performances, including the performance of a work by Paul Engel written especially for the Vienna Piano Trio and Martin Bruns based on poems by Ursula Haas entitled: Getäuscht hat sich der Albatros, Bruns has repeatedly championed contemporary music at the International Music Festival in Lucerne, the Salzburg Easter Festival or the Chamber Music Festival in Ottawa, among others.

Furthermore, in 2004, on the occasion of Francesco Petrarca's 700th birthday, he arranged 25 of his songs for medium voice and piano and performed them for the first time at the Festival Petrarca Musicale, which he himself initiated, at Schloss Kirchheim in Kirchheim unter Teck. Further highlights of his career were the Europe-wide live broadcast of his song recital Flies, you of my youth dreams from the Beethoven-Haus in Bonn, the first performance of Antonín Dvořák's song cycle Zypressen in the original version for voice and piano in Ludwigshafen am Rhein and Ljubljana, a US tour with Jan Philipp Schulze and the double production of Gian Carlo Menotti's The Telephone and Carl Orff's Die Kluge in Basel.

In February 2009 Bruns took over a singing class as substitute at the Zürcher Hochschule der Künste and one year later he was appointed as visiting professor and from 2012 as professor of singing at the Hochschule für Musik "Hanns Eisler" and was elected vice-rector from 2014 to 2016. In addition, he taught singing at the Hochschule für Musik und Tanz Köln, location Aachen, from 2010 to 2012.

Recordings 
 Franz Schubert: Die schöne Müllerin, edited for medium voice and guitar, Martin Bruns and Mats Bergström (guitar), Gehrmans Musikförlag, Stockholm, 1996
 George Frideric Handel: Rinaldo. Opera in three acts, role Argante, Händel Classic Audio HCA 7779, 1997
 George Frederick Handel: Serse. Role of Elviro, Hessian State Theatre Wiesbaden, 1997
 Ignace Strasfogel: Sonata KlNr. 1, Martin Burns and Kolja Lessing (piano), Polygram, Hamburg, 1998
 Franz Schubert: German Schubert Song Edition Vol. 6 (Schiller Song Vol. 1); Martin Bruns and Ulrich Eisenlohr, Naxos, Munich, 2001
 Franz Schubert: German Schubert Song Edition Vol. 8 (Schiller Lieder Vol. 2); Martin Bruns and Ulrich Eisenlohr (piano), Naxos, Munich, 2002 
 Ignace Strasfogel: selected works; Martin Bruns and Kolja Lessing (piano), UniversalMusic, Berlin, 2003
 La Baviera: Homage Music to Elector Karl Albrecht, World Music Distribution, Münster, 2003
 Francesco Petrarca: 25 Songs for medium voice and piano, Martin Bruns (ed. and revised), Bärenreiter, Prague, 2004 
 Young Elite and Legends 2004 in the Cedar Hall at Kirchheim Castle, recording, Bella Musica, Bühl, 2004
 Philipp Jarnach: Early French Songs op. 15:3; Martin Bruns and Kolja Lessing (piano) and Heinrich Keller (flute); Divox, 2004
 Richard Wagner: Tristan and Isolde, Oehmsclassics, Munich, 2005
 Ferruccio Busoni: Busoni Songs; Martin Bruns and Ulrich Eisenlohr, Naxos, Munich, 2006  
 In the night of the spring moon: settings to poems around Maximilian II of Bavaria by Emanuel Geibel and members of the Munich Poetry Circle ("The Crocodiles"); Martin Bruns and Christoph Hammer (piano), Verlag Annette Schumacher, Ratingen, 2008

References

External links 
 
 

Swiss baritones
Juilliard School alumni
Academic staff of the Hochschule für Musik Hanns Eisler Berlin
1960 births
Living people
Musicians from Basel-Stadt